Christopher Karl Davis (born 13 October 1953) is a former Australian Liberal National politician who was the member of the Legislative Assembly of Queensland for Stafford, having defeated Stirling Hinchliffe at the 2012 state election until he resigned in May 2014. He was appointed Assistant Minister for Health on 3 April 2012, but was expelled from the ministry for breaches of cabinet solidarity.

Davis worked as the director of geriatric medicine at The Prince Charles Hospital. He has served as president of the Queensland branch of the Australian Medical Association and was the state chair of the Royal Australasian College of Physicians.

On 13 May 2014, Davis was sacked from Cabinet in response to his speaking against the government on a number of matters. Premier Campbell Newman said Davis had failed to observe the convention that cabinet members and assistant ministers are bound by collective decision making. Although Davis initially stated that he intended to retire at the next state election, he resigned from the Parliament on 23 May 2014. A 2014 Stafford by-election was held on Saturday 19 July 2014.

On 25 July 2014, in an interview on the ABC's 7.30 Queensland, Davis stated that he had resigned from the Liberal National Party and had spoken to Labor state secretary Anthony Chisholm about the potential for continuing his political career with Labor, potentially running in Newman's seat of Ashgrove. The following day, Leader of the Opposition Annastacia Palaszczuk stated that Davis was not a member of the Labor Party and would not be running as a Labor candidate. On the same day, Davis submitted his application to join the Labor Party, and also stated that he was interested in federal politics if he was unsuccessful in obtaining a state seat.

References

1953 births
Living people
Liberal National Party of Queensland politicians
Members of the Queensland Legislative Assembly
Australian geriatricians
University of Cape Town alumni
South African emigrants to Australia
Politicians from Cape Town
21st-century Australian politicians